Ioana Gașpar and Tatiana Perebiynis defeated the defending champions Dája Bedáňová and María Emilia Salerni in the final, 7–6(7-2), 6–3 to win the girls' doubles tennis title at the 2000 Wimbledon Championships.

Seeds

  Dája Bedáňová /  María Emilia Salerni (final)
  Ioana Gașpar /  Tatiana Perebiynis (champions)
  Maki Arai /  Kumiko Iijima (first round)
  Samantha Stosur /  Christina Wheeler (second round)
  Ilona Somers /  Laurette van der Knaap (second round)
  Bethanie Mattek /  Aniela Mojzis (semifinals)
  Martina Babáková /  Ľubomíra Kurhajcová (first round)
  Gisela Dulko /  Roberta Vinci (quarterfinals)

Draw

Finals

Top half

Bottom half

References

External links

Girls' Doubles
Wimbledon Championship by year – Girls' doubles